Witte Automotive develops and produces locking-, handle- and hinge systems for car doors, hatches and seats.

Headquartered in Germany, Witte Automotive (former known as Witte-Velbert GmbH & Co. KG) is the European part of the Vast Alliance, the global automotive supplier alliance for vehicle access products. The privately held company was founded in 1899 by Ewald Witte. After World War II, Witte Automotive began manufacturing door brackets for the motorcar industry.

Corporate structure
In addition to the headquarters Witte Automotive with Sales, R & D and Assembly in Velbert, Germany, Witte-Nejdek in Nejdek, Czech Republic, is also a main part of Witte Automotive. Founded in 1992, this facility developed into a strong partner for assembling as well as for development know-how.

The picture of Witte Automotive is completed the following companies, which contribute their expertise to the Witte-products:
 WITTE Niederberg (former known as Friedr. Fingscheidt GmbH, merged in 2008 and Krosta Metalltechnik (metal technology), merged in 1996) in Velbert and Wülfrath, is the partner for stamped products and zinc die-casting,
 WITTE Bitburg (former: Riku Kunststoff or Riewer Kunststoff (plastic injection molding), merged in 1995), Bitburg, is the competence center for plastic components and
 WITTE Stromberg (former the joint-venture Prinz Witte with Prinz Unternehmensgruppe, founded in 1999), Stromberg, develops and produces hinges.
 A license agreement with Great More, Taiwan, in 1993 was the beginning of the international activities.
 The VAST (Vehicle Access Systems Technology) Alliance, founded in 1999 with Strattec Security Corporation, Milwaukee, and extended in 2006 with Adac Automotive, Grand Rapids, is the foundation for the further global presence of Witte Automotive, which has developed with common joint ventures in 
 Brazil,
 Germany 
 Japan,
 Korea
 India (Minda VAST Access System Private Limited, Pune).

Products

Technics for hoods and tailgates: latches and multifunction-modules, hinges, strikers, etc.
Technics for doors: door modules, door handles, interior actuators, keys/lock sets, keyless/passive entry, latches, power closing, strikers,  hinges, etc.
Technics for seats: Seat back latches, Locking of the seat in several positions, Kinematic-Devices, Seat-to-floor latches, Lockable latches, Release lever (with indication), Strikers, etc.
WITOL WITTE Effective Tolerance Compensation

Other
In 2013, WITTE Automotive won the Volkswagen Group Award, which honors the 21 best suppliers of the Volkswagen Group every year.

References

External links

 http://www.witte-automotive.com
 http://www.vastalliance.com
 http://www.adacplastics.com
 http://www.strattec.com

Automotive companies of Germany
Companies based in North Rhine-Westphalia